Pecqueux is a French occupational surname commonly associated with fishermen. Notable people with the surname include:

Thierry Pecqueux (born 1965), French gymnast
Véronique Pecqueux-Rolland (born 1972), French handballer

French-language surnames
Occupational surnames